Mikael Jansson may refer to:

 Mikael Jansson (politician) (born 1965), Swedish politician 
 Mikael Jansson (photographer) (born 1958), Swedish fashion photographer